An alter ego is an alternate personality or persona.

Alter Ego(s) may also refer to:

Arts and entertainment

Comics
 Alter Ego (magazine), a 1960s comics fanzine, revived as a 1990s professional magazine
 Alter Ego, a First Comics miniseries reviving a variety of Golden Age superheroes

Film and television
 Alter Ego (2007 film), a Greek film starring singer Sakis Rouvas
 Alter Ego (2017 film), a Nigerian film directed by Moses Inwang
 Alter Ego (TV series), a game show
 Alter Egos, a 2012 American film by Jordan Galland
 "Alter Ego" (Star Trek: Voyager), a 1997 television episode

Music

Bands
 Alter Ego (American band), a 1980s melodic rock band
 Alter Ego (German band), a 1992–2008 acid house duo
 Alter Ego (Peruvian band), a neo-progression rock band formed in 1992

Albums
 Alter Ego (Amanda Lear album) or the title song, 1995
 Alter Ego (Prince Royce album), 2020
 Alter Ego (Tyrese album) or the title song, 2006
 Alter Ego (soundtrack), from the 2007 film
 Alter Ego, by Egotrippi, 1998
 Alter Ego, by Harry Sacksioni, or the title song, 1990
 Alter Ego, by Lady Saw, 2014
 Alter Egos, an EP by Ingrid Michaelson, 2017

Songs
 "Alter Ego" (song), by Minus One, 2016
 "Alter Ego", by Tame Impala from InnerSpeaker, 2010

Video games
 Alter Ego (1986 video game), a personality computer game released by Activision
 Alter Ego (2010 video game), an adventure computer game developed by Future Games
 Alter Ego, a character in Danganronpa: Trigger Happy Havoc

Other uses
 Alter/Ego, a real-time vocal synthesizer software by Plogue
 AlterEgo, a wearable silent speech output-input device developed by MIT Media Lab
 "Alter ego", a legal concept related to piercing the corporate veil

See also
Altar Ego, a 2011 album by AKA
 Altar Egos (disambiguation)